Admiral T, whose real name is Christy Campbell, is a French singer of reggae-dancehall music. He is one of the most popular and successful Guadeloupean singers.
He is also a designer and the creator of the clothing trademark WOK LINE.

Biography

Born in 1981 on the French island of Guadeloupe, he was one of two children. He also has roots in the nearby island of Dominica. At the age of 6, he joined the dancehall group Karukera Sound System; he left the group in 1992 to start a solo career; releasing his first album Mozaïk Kréyòl. During the sneak preview of Sean Paul at Bercy Stadium in 2004, Admiral T outperformed himself and drew much attention. Universal Music Group's delegates who attended this concert decided to sign Admiral T and re-released his album on Universal Records, featuring artists like Wyclef Jean or French rapper Rohff. Admiral T's album became a hit throughout the West Indies, France and Europe.

In 2005, Admiral T starred in Guadeloupean director Jean-Claude Barny's film Nèg Maron. The following year, he released his second album, Toucher L'Horizon, which also gained popular and commercial success and got awarded a Césaire of Music Award in October 2006. Admiral T spent much of 2007 in France, London and the Caribbean on his "Fòs A Péyi La" Tour (from his title song duet with Kassav'). Admiral T also won a Skyrock Music Award in December 2007 and a Virgin music Award in February 2008. He launched his own clothing line WOK LINE and made a new tour in Africa during 2008. The following year, Admiral T performed in Germany at Summerjam, Europe's biggest reggae festival and at Dominica's World Creole Music Festival. On 19 April 2010, he released his 3rd album : Instinct Admiral, comprising featurings of Machel Montano, Busy Signal, La Fouine, Médine, Young Chang MC, Lieutenant, Patrick Saint-Éloi, Fanny J and Awa Imani.
Besides his solo career, Admiral T is also the producer of the newcomer reggae-dancehall singer Wyckyd J.

In 2014, he sang On n'oublie pas (written by Serge Bilé) with several artists and personalities including Alpha Blondy, Jocelyne Béroard and Harry Roselmack. This song is a tribute to the 152 victims Martinique of the crash of 16 August 2005, to remember this event and to help the AVCA, the association of the victims of the air disaster, to raise funds.

Personal life 
Campbell has been married to wife and manager Jessica since 2005. They have 3 children: twins Dylan and Lewis and daughter Chealsy. They met at age 20 and wed 4 years later. They have launched a streetwear clothing line.

Nèg Maron 
In the 2005 film, Admiral T plays one of two Guadeloupean residents of an urban slum who survive off of illicit activities.

Discography

Albums

Singles

Featured in

Mixtapes

Compilations

Contributions

Filmography

Films
 Nèg Maron of Jean-Claude Flamand Barny (2005)
 Le Mur du Silence of Jean-Claude Flamand Barny (2009)
 Retour au pays of Julien Dalle (2010)

Concerts
 Le Grand Méchant Zouk (2006)
 Fos a Péyi La Tour (2007)

Reportages
 Mozaïk Kréyòl (2004)
 Toucher L'Horizon (2006)
 Dancehall Story (2008)

Clips

References

External links
[ Admiral T] at Allmusic.com

See also
D.Daly

French reggae musicians
French reggae singers
Dancehall musicians
French dance musicians
French rappers
French male singers
Guadeloupean musicians
1981 births
Living people